The Daughters of Hawaii was founded in 1903 by seven women who were daughters of American Protestant missionaries.  They were born in Hawaii, were citizens of the Kingdom of Hawaii before annexation, and foresaw the inevitable loss of much of the Hawaiian culture. They founded the organization "to perpetuate the memory and spirit of old Hawaii and of historic facts, and to preserve the nomenclature and correct pronunciation of the Hawaiian language."' They run the Hulihee Palace and the Queen Emma Summer Palace.

Hanaiakamalama, now known as the Queen Emma Summer Palace was the "mountain" home of Queen Emma Na'ea, wife of Kamehameha IV. She had inherited it from her uncle, John Young II, son of the famous advisor to Kamehameha I, John Young I. Queen Emma used the home as a retreat where she could escape from the oppressive heat of Honolulu into the coolness of Nuuanu. The Queen Emma Summer Palace was acquired by the Daughters of Hawaii in 1913, narrowly avoiding the demolition of the house and construction of a baseball field on the grounds.

Having acquired and restored Hanaiakamalama, the Daughters set about to save Hulihe‘e Palace in 1924. The Palace was in ruins. The grounds were so overgrown that the house could not be seen from the road. In 1925, the Territorial Legislature purchased Hulihe‘e and set it aside for the Daughters to use and maintain as a museum. When the Daughters finally took over Hulihee in 1927, there was little interest in historic preservation in the islands. At this time, the Inter-Island Steam Navigation Company began to formulate plans for an oceanfront hotel in Kailua-Kona. They decided that the Hulihee grounds was the most desirable location in Kailua-Kona and at once began to pressure the Daughters to relinquish Hulihee. The ladies held firm and because of their spirit, the State of Hawaii has an important educational museum and Kailua-Kona still has some open waterfront. Hulihee Palace was placed on the National Register of Historic Places in 1973.

The Daughters of Hawaii also own and maintain the site of Kamehameha III's birth at Keauhou Bay, Kona. It is also added to the Register of Historic Places in 1978.

The Daughters of Hawaii is a 501(c)3 nonprofit organization supported by donations, dues, admission fees and fundraising events.

External links
Daughters of Hawaii official web site

Organizations based in Hawaii
Hawaii culture
Lineage societies
Hawaii (island)
State based fraternal and lineage societies
History of women in Hawaii
1903 establishments in Hawaii
Organizations established in 1903